Malaysia Youth & Student Democratic Movement (abbrev: DEMA) formed on 17 September 1998. The movement consists of a group of students from various universities who were responsible for presenting the effects of globalization on the youth and student movement in Malaysia. The presentation was in November 1998 where two conferences - Asia Pacific Economic Cooperation (APEC) and the Asia Pacific People’s Assembly (APPA) were organized around that issue of economic policy in the framework of globalization and human rights.

Structure
DEMA has a network involving several state campuses in Malaysia. DEMA has a national body with bases known as Students Progressive Front in several state universities across Malaysia. The Students Progressive Fronts are largely autonomous, with internal meetings, activities and annual general meetings (AGM) where posts are elected. Within each Students Progressive Front, there is an external coordinator who also functions as the Campus Coordinator of DEMA. The Campus Coordinator ensures that information, issues, activities and members flow between the Students Progressive Front at the campus level and DEMA. DEMA coordinates different campus-based issues and activities at the national level. The structure of DEMA encourages bottom-up participation.

References

External links
 
 
 

1998 establishments in Malaysia
Student organizations established in 1998
Non-profit organisations based in Malaysia
Youth organisations based in Malaysia
Human rights organisations based in Malaysia